The 2021 Three Nations Cup was a friendly international association football tournament organised and control by the All Nepal Football Association (ANFA).

Venue
All matches were held at the Dasarath Rangasala in Kathmandu, Nepal.

Standings
<onlyinclude>
<onlyinclude>

Matches

League stage

Final

Statistics

References

International association football competitions hosted by Nepal
2020–21 in Nepalese football
March 2021 sports events in Asia